Portunus is a genus of crab which includes several important species for fisheries, such as the blue swimming crab, Portunus pelagicus and the Gazami crab, P. trituberculatus. Other species, such as the three-spotted crab (P. sanguinolentus) are caught as bycatch.

The genus Portunus contains more than 90 extant species and over 40 further species known only from fossils.

Fossils of crabs within this genus can be found in sediment of Europe, the United States, Mexico, Venezuela, Brazil and Australia from Paleogene to recent (age range: 48.6 to 0.0 million years ago).

The extant species are as follows:

References

Portunoidea
Paleogene genus first appearances
Extant Paleogene first appearances
Decapod genera